Geoff Joshua (born 12 March 1970) is an Australian cricket umpire. He has stood in matches in the Big Bash League tournament. He has also stood in women's One Day International matches in the 2014–16 ICC Women's Championship.

In November 2017, along with Gerard Abood, he was one of the on-field umpires for the Women's Ashes Test match between Australia and England.

References

External links
 

1970 births
Living people
Australian cricket umpires
Sportspeople from Melbourne